Jiading Xincheng is a station on Line 11 of the Shanghai Metro. It was opened on December 31, 2009.

The station has one side platform and one island platform with three tracks. The side platform is for trains bound for North Jiading and Huaqiao on a single track; the island platform serves trains headed for Disney Resort on two tracks.

References 
 

Railway stations in Shanghai
Line 11, Shanghai Metro
Shanghai Metro stations in Jiading District
Railway stations in China opened in 2009